Teočin is a village in the municipality of Gornji Milanovac, Serbia. At the 2002 census, the village had a population of 690 people.

References

Populated places in Moravica District